Béjaïa, formerly Bougie and Bugia, is a Mediterranean port city and commune on the Gulf of Béjaïa in Algeria; it is the capital of Béjaïa Province, Kabylia. Béjaïa is the largest principally Kabyle-speaking city in the region of Kabylia, Algeria.

Geography 

The town is overlooked by the mountain , whose profile is said to resemble a sleeping woman. Other nearby scenic spots include the Aiguades beach and the Pic des Singes (Peak of the Monkeys); the latter site is a habitat for the endangered Barbary macaque, which prehistorically had a much broader distribution than at present. All three of these geographic features are located in the Gouraya National Park. The Soummam river runs past the town.

Under French rule, it was known under various European names, such as Budschaja in German, Bugia in Italian, and Bougie  in French. The French and Italian versions, due to the town's wax trade, eventually acquired the metonymic meaning of "candle".

History

Antiquity and Byzantine era 

According to Al-Bakri, the bay was first inhabited by Andalusians.

Béjaïa stands on the site of the ancient city of Saldae, a minor port in Carthaginian and Roman times, in an area at first inhabited by Numidian Berbers and founded as a colony for old soldiers by emperor Augustus. It was an important town and a bishopric in the province of Mauretania Caesariensis, and later Sitifensis.

In the fifth century, Saldae became the capital of the short-lived Vandal Kingdom of the Germanic Vandals, which ended in about 533 with the Byzantine conquest, which established an African prefecture and later the Exarchate of Carthage.

Muslim and feudal rulers 

After the 7th-century Muslim conquest, it was refounded as "Béjaïa"; the Hammadid dynasty made it their capital, and it became an important port and centre of culture.

According to Muhammad al-Idrisi, the port was, in the 11th century, a market place between Mediterranean merchant ships and caravans coming from the Sahara desert. Christian merchants settled funduqs (or Khans) in Bejaïa. The Italian city of Pisa was closely tied to Béjaïa, where it built one of its two permanent consulates in the African continent.

The son of a Pisan merchant (and probably consul), posthumously known as Fibonacci (c. 1170 – c. 1250), there learned about mathematics (which he called "Modus Indorum") and Hindu-Arabic numerals. He introduced modern mathematics into medieval Europe. A mathematical-historical analysis of Fibonacci's context and proximity to Béjaïa, an important exporter of wax in his time, has suggested that it was actually the bee-keepers of Béjaïa and the knowledge of the bee ancestries that truly inspired the Fibonacci sequence rather than the rabbit reproduction model as presented in his famous book Liber Abaci.

In 1315, Ramon Llull was stoned at Béjaïa, where, a few years before, Peter Armengaudius (Peter Armengol) is reputed to have been hanged.

After a Spanish occupation (1510–55), the city was taken by the Ottoman Turks in the Capture of Béjaïa in 1555. For nearly three centuries, Béjaïa was a stronghold of the Barbary pirates (see Barbary States). The city consisted of Arabic-speaking Moors, Moriscos and Jews increased by Jewish refugees from Spain. Berber peoples lived not in the city but the surrounding villages and travelled to the city occasionally for markets.

City landmarks include a 16th-century mosque and a fortress built by the Spanish in 1545.

A picture of the Orientalist painter Maurice Boitel, who painted in the city for a while, can be found in the museum of Béjaïa.

French colonial rule 
It was captured by the French in 1833 and became a part of colonial Algeria. Most of the time it was the seat ('sous-préfecture') of an arrondissement (mid 20th century, 513,000 inhabitants, of whom 20,000 'Bougiates' in the city itself) in the Département of Constantine, until Bougie was promoted to département itself in 1957.

Battle of Béjaïa 
During World War II, Operation Torch landed forces in North Africa, including a battalion of the British Royal West Kent Regiment at Béjaïa on 11 November 1942.

That same day, at 4:40 PM, a German Luftwaffe air raid struck Béjaïa with thirty Ju 88 bombers and torpedo planes. The transports  and Cathay were sunk and the monitor HMS Roberts was damaged. The following day, the anti-aircraft ship SS Tynwald was torpedoed and sank, while the transport Karanja was bombed and destroyed.

Algerian republic 
After Algerian independence, it became the eponymous capital of Béjaïa Province, covering part of the eastern Berber region Kabylia.

Ecclesiastical history 
With the spread of Christianity, Saldae became a bishopric. Its bishop Paschasius was one of the Catholic bishops whom the Arian Vandal king Huneric summoned to Carthage in 484 and then exiled.
 
Christianity survived the Islamic conquest, the disappearance of the old city of Saldae, and the founding of the new city of Béjaïa. A letter from Pope Gregory VII (1073–1085) exists, addressed to clero et populo Buzee (the clergy and people of Béjaïa), in which he writes of the consecration of a bishop named Servandus for Christian North Africa.

No longer a residential bishopric, Saldae (v.) is today listed by the Catholic Church as a titular see. and still has incumbents by that title (mostly of the lowest (episcopal) rank, some of the intermediary archiepiscopal rank).

Titular see of Bugia 
This titular see was for a long time, alternatively and concurrently with the city's authentic Roman Latin name Saldae (v.), called Bugia, the Italian language form (used in the Roman Curia) of Béjaïa.

The 'modern' form and title, Bugia, seems out of use, after having had the following incumbents, all of the lowest (episcopal) rank :
 Miguel Morro (1510 – ?), as Auxiliary Bishop of Mallorca (Balearic Spain) (1510 – ?)
 Fernando de Vera y Zuñiga, Augustinians (O.E.S.A.) (1614.02.17 – 1628.11.13), as Auxiliary Bishop of Badajoz (Spain) (1614.02.17 – 1628.11.13); later Metropolitan Archbishop of Santo Domingo, finally Archbishop-Bishop of Cusco (Peru) (1629.07.16 – death 1638.11.09)
 François Perez (1687.02.05 – death 1728.09.20), as Apostolic Vicar of Cochin (Vietnam) (1687.02.05 – 1728.09.20)
 Antonio Mauricio Ribeiro (1824.09.27 – death ?), as Auxiliary Bishop of Évora (Portugal) (1824.09.27 – ?)
 George Hilary Brown (5 June 1840 until 22 April 1842), as first and only Apostolic Vicar of Lancashire District (England) (1840.06.05 – 1850.09.29), later Titular Bishop of Tlous (1842.04.22 – 1850.09.29), promoted first bishop of successor see Liverpool (1850.09.29 – 1856.01.25)

Climate 
Béjaïa, like most cities along the coast of Algeria, has a Mediterranean climate (Köppen climate classification Csa), with very warm, dry summers and mild, wet winters.

Demography 

The population of the city in 2008 in the latest census was 177,988.

Economy 

The northern terminus of the Hassi Messaoud oil pipeline from the Sahara, Béjaïa is the principal oil port of the Western Mediterranean. Exports, aside from crude petroleum, include iron, phosphates, wines, dried figs, and plums. The city also has textile and cork industries.

The Béni Mansour-Bejaïa line railroad terminates in Béjaïa. The airport of the city is Abane Ramdane Airport.

Cevital has its head office in the city.

The city's soccer team is JSM Béjaïa and currently plays in the Algerian Ligue Professionnelle 2.

Twin towns – sister cities
Béjaïa has an official friendly relationship with:

 Glasgow, Scotland, since 1995
 Brest
 Bad Homburg

Villages 
 

Ilougane

Notable people 
 

Nihad Hihat (born 1994), volleyball player

See also 

 European enclaves in North Africa before 1830
 List of lighthouses in Algeria
 Saldae, for Roman history and concurrent Catholic titular see

 Related people
 Abu al-Salt
 Fibonacci

References

External links 

 Bgayet.Net
 History of Béjaïa
 GigaCatholic, with titular incumbent biography links
 Google map of Béjaïa

Communes of Béjaïa Province
Former Spanish colonies
Kabylie
Cities in Algeria
Province seats of Algeria
Lighthouses in Algeria
Berber populated places